Canavesi is a surname. Notable people with the surname include:

 Adhemar Canavesi (1903–1984), Uruguayan footballer 
 Jorge Canavesi (1920–2016), Argentine basketball player and coach
 Severino Canavesi (1911–1990), Italian cyclist

See also 

 Canavese (disambiguation)